Behiye Aksoy (born Behiye Tetiker; 19 September 1933 – 31 May 2015) was a Turkish female singer of Turkish classical music genre.

Early years
She was born in Istanbul on 19 September 1933. Her maiden surname was Tetiker. After primary school in İstanbul, her family moved to Ankara, where she finished junior high school.

Music career
At the age of 15, she applied to audition with Ankara Radio. She was among the five successful candidates out of 200. She was one of the Turkish music singers of Ankara Radio for nine years. In 1958, for the first time she got on stage in Ankara. Three years later, she moved to İstanbul and became one of the two star performers of the "Maksim Gazino", the most famous night club of Turkey at the time. The other star performer was Zeki Müren.

She also released records, about 100 45-rpm and 20 LPs. She played in four films. She received a platinum diadem for her success from her record company.

Private life
She married three times. The first was with Halil Aksoy, a musician between 1952 and 1963. Halil Aksoy was the father of her only son Ahmet Kazım. Although they were divorced, she kept the surname Aksoy. Her two other marriages were short-lived. Between 1973 and 1974, she married Berker İnanoğlu, a film producer. Her third marriage was with Fahrettin Aslan, the owner of the Maksim night club, which also ended in the same year.

She died in İstanbul on 31 May 2015. She was buried in Zincirlikuyu Cemetery.

Albums
Her albums are the following: Some of these albums are collections of her records.

Filmography
The films she took part are the following;
Taş Plaktan Bugüne
Deli Deli Tepeli
Falcı
Kederli Günlerim

References

1933 births
Singers from Istanbul
20th-century Turkish women singers
Turkish classical singers
2015 deaths
Burials at Zincirlikuyu Cemetery
Turkish radio people